The Great Circle may refer to:

The Great Circle, the journal of the Australian Association for Maritime History
The Great Circle Tour, a 2017 world tour by the band Midnight Oil
Great Circle Earthworks, a section of the Newark Earthworks in Ohio, US
The Great Circle, the book series of Andromeda (novel)

See also
Great circle, the intersection of a sphere and a plane that passes through the center point of the sphere
Great Circle (novel), a 2021 novel by Maggie Shipstead